William Manning Marable (May 13, 1950 – April 1, 2011) was an American professor of public affairs, history and African-American Studies at Columbia University. Marable founded and directed the Institute for Research in African-American Studies. He wrote several texts and was active in numerous progressive political causes.

At the time of his death, he had completed a biography of human rights activist Malcolm X, titled Malcolm X: A Life of Reinvention (2011).  Marable was posthumously awarded the 2012 Pulitzer Prize for History for this work.

Life and career

Marable was born and raised in Dayton, Ohio. His parents were both graduates of Central State, an historically black university in nearby Wilberforce. His mother was an ordained minister and held a Ph.D. In April 1968, at the behest of his mother, 17-year-old Marable covered the funeral of Martin Luther King Jr. for Dayton's black newspaper. He graduated from Jefferson Township High School shortly thereafter.

Marable received his Bachelor of Arts degree from Earlham College (1971) and went on to earn his master's degree (1972) and Ph.D. (1976) in history, at the University of Wisconsin, and University of Maryland. Marable served on the faculty of Smith College, Tuskegee Institute, University of San Francisco, Cornell University, Fisk University, served as the founding director of the Africana and Hispanic Studies Program at Colgate University, Purdue University, Ohio State University, and University of Colorado at Boulder, where he was chairman of the Department of Black Studies. He was recruited in 1993 by Columbia University professor Eric Foner to be the founding director of Columbia's Institute for Research in African-American Studies, and was later appointed as the M. Moran Weston and Black Alumni Council Professor of African-American Studies and professor of history and public affairs.

In 1979, Marable joined the New American Movement (NAM), an organization of veterans of the New Left who were trying to build a successor to Students for a Democratic Society. In 1982, NAM merged with Michael Harrington’s Democratic Socialist Organizing Committee to form the Democratic Socialists of America (DSA), and Marable was elected as one of the new organization’s vice chairs. He left the DSA in 1985 after Michael Harrington and his allies, following the lead of much of the mainstream union leadership, refused to back Jesse Jackson’s insurgent campaign in 1984.

Marable served as Chair of Movement for a Democratic Society (MDS). Marable served on the Board of Directors for the Hip-Hop Summit Action Network (HSAN), a non-profit coalition of public figures working to utilize hip-hop as an agent for social change. Marable was also a member of the New York Legislature's Amistad Commission, created to review state curriculum regarding the slave trade.

Personal life
Marable was married twice, first to his Earlham classmate, Hazel Ann Marable, and then from 1996 until his death, to Leith Mullings, Distinguished Professor of Anthropology at the Graduate Center of the City University of New York.

Marable was a critic of Afrocentrism. He wrote:

It was reported in June 2004 by activist group Racism Watch that Marable had called for immediate action to be taken to end the U.S. military's use of Raphael Patai's book The Arab Mind, which Marable described as "a book full of racially charged stereotypes and generalizations." In a 2008 column, Marable endorsed Senator Barack Obama's bid for the 2008 Democratic presidential nomination.
 
Marable, who was diagnosed with sarcoidosis, underwent a double lung transplant as treatment in mid-2010. Marable died of complications from pneumonia on April 1, 2011, in New York City at the age of 60.

Malcolm X biography

Marable's biography of Malcolm X concluded that Malcolm X exaggerated his early criminal career, and engaged in a homosexual relationship with a white businessman. He also concluded that some of the killers of Malcolm X are still alive and were never charged.

Critics of the biography contend that the focus on Marable's discussion of Malcolm's potential same-sex relationships, about three sentences long in a 592-page book, overlooks more important political statements Marable makes about Malcolm's underlying lifelong commitment to revolutionary Pan Africanism.

Malcolm X: A Life of Reinvention was nominated for the National Book Award, and The New York Times ranked it among the 10 Best Books of 2011. It was one of three nominees for the inaugural Andrew Carnegie Medal for Excellence in Nonfiction (2012) presented by the American Library Association for the best adult non-fiction. It was awarded the Pulitzer Prize for History in 2012.

Writings
 How Capitalism Underdeveloped Black America (1983), 
 African and Caribbean Politics: From Kwame Nkrumah to Maurice Bishop (1987), 
 Race, Reform and Rebellion (1991), 
 Beyond Black and White: Transforming African American Politics (1995), 
 Speaking Truth to Power: Essays on Race, Resistance, and Radicalism (1996), 
 Black Liberation in Conservative America (1997), 
 Black Leadership (1998), 
 Let Nobody Turn Us Around (2000), 
 Freedom: A Photographic History of the African American Struggle (with Leith Mullings and Sophie Spencer-Wood, 2002), 
 The Great Wells of Democracy: The Meaning of Race in American Life (2003), 
 W. E. B. DuBois: Black Radical Democrat (2005), 
 The Autobiography of Medgar Evers (2005, with Myrlie Evers-Williams), 
 Malcolm X: A Life of Reinvention (2011), 
 Living Black History: How Reimagining the African-American Past Can Remake America's Racial Future (2011), 
 The Portable Malcolm X Reader (2013, with Garrett Felber),

References

External links
Finding aid to the Manning Marable papers at Columbia University Rare Book & Manuscript Library

20th-century American historians
21st-century American historians
21st-century American male writers
Historians of African Americans
African-American historians
American Marxist historians
American political scientists
American political writers
American social sciences writers
African-American social scientists
Black studies scholars
Critics of Afrocentrism
Pulitzer Prize for History winners
Earlham College alumni
Columbia University faculty
Writers from New York City
Writers from Dayton, Ohio
Lung transplant recipients
Deaths from pneumonia in New York (state)
American male non-fiction writers
University of Maryland, College Park alumni
Academics from Ohio
People from Dayton, Ohio
1950 births
2011 deaths
Historians from New York (state)
Historians from Ohio